is the name given to a male bearded seal which was first spotted on August 7, 2002 near Maruko Bridge on Tama River in Tokyo, Japan, and subsequently became a national celebrity in Japan.

Name
Tama-chan is named after the river (Tama) where he was first sighted. Strictly speaking, Tama is the actual name of the seal, and the -chan suffix is a Japanese title (similar to -san) which marks endearment and/or cuteness.

Sightings
The first sighting of the seal was reported heavily in the Japanese media amid speculation as to whether the normally arctic seal could survive in a Tokyo river during summertime. Subsequent sightings generated massive publicity as huge crowds gathered to watch and TV crews broadcast live footage across Japan.

Tama-chan subsequently moved to rivers in nearby central Yokohama where he was a regular sight in Tsurumi and Katabira Rivers for the following months. Thousands gathered on bridges in the city daily to catch a glimpse of the celebrity animal. Merchandise went on sale and fan clubs were organised, and daily updates on Tama-chan were broadcast on TV. Seeing the seal was said to have a "healing" effect on people.

Jūminhyō registration and controversy
Yokohama's Nishi Ward even granted an honorary jūminhyō (residency registration) to Tama-chan. In early 2003 this prompted a group of foreign residents protesting against the fact that jūminhyō is only open to Japanese citizens (foreign nationals were registered under a separate system), to stage a march with whiskers drawn on their faces to demand a jūminhyō even though Saitama Prefecture has given fictional jūminhyō to public fixtures before either real or imaginary, such as Crayon Shin-Chan. That system was later changed, and from July 9, 2012 foreign nationals residing in Japan are registered in the jūminhyō.

Attempted capture
In March 2003, a group calling themselves "Society That Thinks About Tama-chan", attempted to capture the seal with fishing nets in order to send it back to Arctic waters with the help of a little-known US-based group called "Marine Animals Lifeline". A doomsday cult called Pana-Wave Laboratory, which was revealed to be behind this group, pseudoscientifically thought that electromagnetic waves led the seal astray, and also that returning the seal to arctic waters would somehow "save the world from destruction". The cult had even built two swimming pools to keep the animal until it could be transferred. The illegal attempt failed when Tama-chan slipped through the net.

Tama-chan disappeared out of sight a few days later. When Tama-chan reappeared in Nakagawa river in Tokyo with a fishing hook embedded in his right eyebrow, it made national headline news and Japan's Environment Minister Shun'ichi Suzuki was asked about the well-being of the animal.

Last sighting
Tama-chan lived in the Arakawa River. Attention from the media, not to mention the Pana Wave Laboratory, faded, and the crowds reduced to a handful of Tama-chan watchers and amateur photographers. Signs in the vicinity warned people that anyone attempting to capture or harm the animal would be prosecuted, and that the river bank was under CCTV surveillance. The last confirmed sighting occurred on April 12, 2004.

In following years, a number of other seals have been spotted around Japan. In 2004 "Kamo-chan", a one year old spotted seal, was spotted near Kamogawa, Chiba and in 2011 "Ara-chan", another spotted seal, appeared in Saitama Prefecture's Arakawa river in 2011.

See also
 Slippery the Sea Lion
 Benny the Beluga Whale

References

Individual animals in Japan
Individual wild animals
Wayward seals and sea lions